John Edgar Fowler (September 8, 1866 – July 4, 1930) was a member of the United States House of Representatives from the state of North Carolina in the United States Congress.

He was a Populist and attended Wake Forest University.

He died at his home in Clinton, North Carolina on July 4, 1930.

References

External links
 

1866 births
1930 deaths
North Carolina Populists
People from Sampson County, North Carolina
People's Party members of the United States House of Representatives from North Carolina
Members of the United States House of Representatives from North Carolina